Rowing competed at the 2006 Asian Games in Doha, Qatar. Men's and women's singles, doubles, and fours competition took place at the West Bay Lagoon from December 3 to December 7. Since Doha was scarce of water the distance had to be shortened from standard 2000 meters to 1000 metres.

Schedule

Medalists

Men

Women

Medal table

Participating nations
A total of 172 athletes from 20 nations competed in rowing at the 2006 Asian Games:

References

External links
Official Website

 
2006 Asian Games events
Asian Games
2006
Rowing competitions in Qatar